Bierrum is a British civil engineering and construction company, that has built all of Britain's concrete cooling towers at the country's power stations since 1965.

History
It was founded by Hans Bierrum (or Hans Bjerrum), a Danish civil engineer. He built his first cooling tower in the 1930s. Hans Bjerrum, born in Hellerup, competed in the 1920 Summer Olympics in Belgium; he died in 1979 in London. The company has also been called Bierrum International.

Bierrum and Partners Ltd (00339806) was founded on 30 April 1938.

Ownership
It is part of Beroa Technology Group GmbH (BTG) of Ratingen-Lintorf, North Rhine-Westphalia, Germany.

Structure
It is headquartered in Central Bedfordshire, around one mile east of the M1, close to the Greensand Ridge Walk.

Products
It has designed and built cooling towers (køletårn in Danish) and chimneys nationally and internationally. It demolishes chimneys incrementally, with its Bierrum Rig.

See also
 J. L. Eve Construction, built other UK electricity transmission infrastructure
 Denmark–United Kingdom relations
 Arup Group
 Institute of Demolition Engineers, based in Kent
 :Category:Construction and civil engineering companies of Denmark

References

External links
 Bierrum

British companies established in 1938
Central Bedfordshire District
Chimneys in the United Kingdom
Companies based in Bedfordshire
Construction and civil engineering companies of the United Kingdom
Cooling towers
Demolition
Denmark–United Kingdom relations
1938 establishments in England
Construction and civil engineering companies established in 1938